Hampshire County Cricket Club was established in August 1863.  Since then, the club has played first-class and List A cricket at a number of different home grounds.  Their first home first-class match was against Sussex in 1864 at the Antelope Ground, Southampton.  The current headquarters of Hampshire County Cricket Club is the Rose Bowl, which located on the edge of Southampton.  This venue is also used by England as a Test and One Day International venue.

As of 12 September 2011, Hampshire have played 1,396 first-class matches and 925 List A matches at 12 different home grounds.  They have also played 45 Twenty20 matches, all of which have taken place at the Rose Bowl.  The 12 grounds that Hampshire have used for home matches are listed below, with statistics complete through the end of the 2011 season.

Grounds

Notes

References

Hampshire County Cricket Club
Cricket grounds in Hampshire
Hampshire
Hampshire-related lists